The British-American hard rock band Whitesnake have released thirteen studio albums, nine live albums, twelve compilation albums, three box sets, two extended plays (EPs), 40 singles, nine video albums and 29 music videos. Formed in London in 1978 by vocalist David Coverdale, the band originally featured guitarists Micky Moody and Bernie Marsden, bassist Neil Murray, keyboardist Peter Solley and drummer Dave Dowle. The group's debut EP Snakebite was released in June 1978 and reached number 61 on the UK Singles Chart. After replacing Solley with Jon Lord, the band released their debut full-length album Trouble later in the year, which reached number 50 on the UK Albums Chart. 1979's Lovehunter reached number 29 on the chart. Lead single "Long Way from Home" charted at number 55.

Dowle was replaced by Ian Paice after the release of Lovehunter, and in 1980 Whitesnake reached the UK top ten for the first time with Ready an' Willing, which peaked at number 6 and was certified gold by the British Phonographic Industry (BPI). The album was also the band's first to register on the US Billboard 200, reaching number 90. The album's lead single "Fool for Your Loving" reached number 13 on the UK Singles Chart. The group's first live release, Live... in the Heart of the City, reached number 5 on the UK Albums Chart and was certified platinum by the BPI. 1981's Come an' Get It and 1982's Saints & Sinners also both reached the UK top ten, with the former reaching a peak of number 2 (the band's highest to date). Three singles from across the two albums reached the UK Singles Chart top 40.

After a brief hiatus and several lineup changes, Whitesnake resurfaced in 1984 with Slide It In, which was their first album to reach the US top 40. It was also the band's first release to be certified by the Recording Industry Association of America (RIAA), reaching double platinum status. 1987's Whitesnake was even more successful, reaching number 2 on the Billboard 200, number 5 on the Canadian Albums Chart, and the top ten in several other regions. The album was certified eight times platinum by the RIAA, five times platinum by Music Canada, and platinum by the BPI. The single "Here I Go Again" topped the Billboard Hot 100 and the Canadian Singles Chart, as well as reaching the top ten of the UK Singles Chart. Its follow-up "Is This Love" reached number 2 on the Hot 100 and number 9 in the UK. The band's 1989 release Slip of the Tongue was the band's only other album to reach the US top ten, and the last to be certified by the RIAA (reaching platinum status).

Whitesnake broke up in 1991. Three years later, Greatest Hits was released as the band's first compilation album, reaching number 4 on the UK Albums Chart and being certified gold by the BPI. The band returned with Restless Heart in 1997, which peaked at number 34 in the UK. In 2002 the band returned on a permanent basis. The 2003 compilation Best of Whitesnake reached number 44 in the UK and was certified gold by the BPI, while the 2006 video release Live... in the Still of the Night reached number 2 on the UK Music Video Chart and was also certified gold. Whitesnake's tenth studio album Good to Be Bad was released in 2008, reaching number 7 in the UK and number 62 in the US. In 2011, the band reached number 33 with Forevermore and number 81 with Live at Donington 1990, in 2013 they reached number 67 with Made in Japan, and in 2015 they reached number 18 with The Purple Album.

Albums

Studio albums

Live albums

Compilations

Box sets

Extended plays

Singles

Notes:

Videos

Video albums

Music videos

References

External links
Whitesnake official website

Discography
Discographies of British artists
Heavy metal group discographies
Rock music group discographies